Michael Rolfe (born 1978) was the national chair of the British POA trade union until May 2017, and lead figure within which represents prison officers, related grades of staff and others working in secure custodial settings. He stepped down from this position on 3 May 2017 having been selected as a parliamentary candidate for the Labour Party for the Sittingbourne and Sheppey constituency at the snap general election that took place on 8 June 2017. However, despite an 11% swing to Labour and a 62% increase in votes for Labour compared to 2015, Rolfe failed to be elected and finished in second place to the sitting Conservative MP, Gordon Henderson who was re-elected with a majority of 15,211 votes.

In August 2019, it was recorded in the press that Rolfe had resigned from the Labour Party citing Jeremy Corbyn's Brexit policy as his main reasons.

Born 25 January 1978 in Barnehurst, South London, son of council worker David Frederick Rolfe (deceased) and retired Secretary Dorothy Jane Mungeam (Rolfe), aged 38 years at the time of taking over as the national chair of the POA, he was one of the youngest trade union leaders in the United Kingdom.

Rolfe attended Barnes Cray Primary School from 1983 to 1989, followed by Erith Secondary School in South London from 1989 to 1994 before attending Bexley College to complete A-Levels.

In 1996, Rolfe started his working career, training to become an accountant and progressing quickly as he earned a reputation for hard work, dedication and commitment. However, following his father's premature death aged 57 in 2002, Rolfe quit his job; pursuing more menial employment and became a prison officer at HM Prison Elmley in 2004.

Rolfe identifies as a socialist, however he was quick to make clear his views are not entirely left wing in an interview with the Morning Star, clarifying that he does not share the same political ideology of Democratic Socialists such as Jeremy Corbyn.

Rolfe first found notoriety amongst his colleagues in the Prison Service when he established the popular Facebook page known as 'Know The Danger,' or 'KTD' abbreviated, in May 2013 at a point in which major restructuring took place within the prison system.  These changes have been heavily criticised and attributed to the current systematic failures within the UK Prison Service, manifesting in the worst reported riots in 25 years during 2016.

Rolfe became a prominent figure during the latter part of 2016 following a string of appearances on BBC News at Ten and various other news outlets forcing the Secretary of State for Justice Liz Truss to concede "serious issues" that would take time to resolve within the prison estate.

Mike Rolfe founded the Criminal Justice Workers Union or (CJWU) on 6 April 2020. Since its formation, the union has struggled to become recognised by many employers.

Prior to standing as a Labour Party candidate in the 2017 General Election, Rolfe stood in the 2013 Kent County Council elections for TUSC in the constituency of Sheppey, finishing 5th with 2% of the overall vote share.

References

"Former Labour candidate for Sittingbourne and Sheppey, Mike Rolfe, defects to Conservative Party"
"Brexit: Mike Rolfe quits as Sittingbourne and Sheppey Labour Party candidate in disagreement with Jeremy Corbyn"
Coronavirus Kent: New Criminal Justice Workers Union for prison staff set up by Sheppey officers
"Prison crisis: governors losing control but don’t want to admit it, says POA chair"
"Two wings out of action - but Bedford prisoners did not turn violent"
"Two prison officers "seriously injured" by Wormwood Scrubs inmate days after safety protest"
"Swaleside prison: Sixty inmates take control of wing and light fires".

1978 births
People from the Royal Borough of Greenwich
Trade unionists from London
Living people